is a Japanese mixed martial artist. A professional competitor since 2002, Okami has competed for the UFC, PRIDE, Pancrase, M-1 Global, World Series of Fighting, DEEP, Professional Fighters League, and ONE Championship.

Mixed martial arts career

Early career
As an amateur, Okami fought in the pre-PRIDE 4 tournament, defeating two opponents before submitting Yuuki Tsutsui in the finals via triangle choke to win the tournament. He began his professional career in 2002, fighting in the GCM promotion and Pancrase, as well as making an appearance at Pride FC: The Best, Vol. 3, amassing a professional record of 7–0. In 2003, he competed in the ADCC Submission Wrestling World Championship, but was defeated by Matt Lindland. Also in 2003, he suffered his first professional MMA loss to Amar Suloev.

Okami continued fighting in multiple promotions before arriving at Rumble on the Rock, where he entered a 175 lb tournament. Anderson Silva, Frank Trigg, Carlos Condit, and Jake Shields also competed in the tournament. In the opening round, Okami fought the future UFC Middleweight Champion Anderson Silva. Silva controlled the fight on the feet before Okami secured a takedown. Okami landed a few blows from top position before Silva landed an illegal upkick to Okami's chin while both fighters were grounded, and Silva was in the guard position. Okami's knees were on the ground at the time, making the attack an illegal strike to the head of a downed opponent. Silva later said that the rule had not been properly explained to him before the bout. "When I fought Okami, the rules really weren't explained to me properly in the event I was fighting in," said Silva. "You could kick a downed opponent to the groin or to the head when your back's on the ground. So the rules weren't explained to me properly." Referee Troy Mandaloniz held Silva back and gave the wobbled Okami time to recover. Okami could not recover, and the fight was declared a disqualification victory for Okami. Silva responded by asserting he "felt it was a cheap, cowardly way of winning," and that "people that were there saw that he was in the condition to come back and keep fighting, and he didn't." Moving on to the next round, Okami faced the future EliteXC welterweight and Strikeforce Middleweight Champion Jake Shields, a tournament favorite. Okami lost a hard-fought majority decision to Shields, who went on to win the tournament.

Ultimate Fighting Championship

2006–2007
By 2006, Okami had amassed a record of 17–3 and was the third-ranked Pancrase Middleweight fighter. He signed with the UFC and made his debut in the organization on the undercard of UFC 62, defeating Alan Belcher by unanimous decision. He followed up less than two months later with a bout against Kalib Starnes at UFC 64. He defeated Starnes by TKO due to strikes in the third round. Okami then signed on to make his third appearance in four months at UFC 66. His original opponent was to be David Terrell, but Terrell withdrew due to an elbow injury and was replaced by Rory Singer. Okami defeated Singer by submission due to strikes late in the third round.

After three victories in the UFC, Okami made his main card and broadcast debut at UFC 69 against Mike Swick, who was riding a five-fight win streak in the UFC at the time. Okami won the bout via unanimous decision. Okami then participated in the 2007 ADCC Submission Wrestling World Championship in the 87 kg (191 lb) division, but lost to eventual division winner Demian Maia. In the UFC, however, Okami was riding a four-fight win streak. In his next bout, he faced former UFC Middleweight Champion Rich Franklin at UFC 72 for the position of the #1 contender in the middleweight division. Franklin controlled the first two rounds, but Okami nearly sunk in a kimura in the third. Ultimately, all three judges scored the bout 29–28 in Franklin's favor.

2008–2009
Okami next faced Jason MacDonald at UFC 77. MacDonald had also defeated Singer and lost to Franklin in his two previous bouts. Though Dana White said that the winner might earn a title shot, the fight was placed on the undercard, possibly due to the fighters' lack of fan support. Okami dominated the fight with superior stand-up, takedown defense, and ground control en route to a unanimous decision victory.

Okami next faced former UFC Middleweight Champion Evan Tanner in Tanner's first fight in two years. The fight occurred at UFC 82 on March 1, 2008, in Columbus, Ohio. After dropping Tanner with a straight left in round 1, Okami landed a knee in the Muay Thai clinch position that knocked out Tanner 3 minutes into round 2.

Okami was scheduled for a rematch with Anderson Silva for the Middleweight Championship at UFC 90, but he was forced to drop out of the bout due to a broken hand. Patrick Côté was chosen to replace him. After his recovery, Okami faced 2003 ADCC Absolute Division gold medalist Dean Lister at UFC 92 and earned a unanimous decision. Lister made frequent attempts to pull guard and take Okami down to the ground, but was not able to secure any submissions. The bout was considered tedious by spectators, but Okami was victorious. Okami was next scheduled to return at UFC 98 against Dan Miller, but suffered a torn ligament and was not able to compete.

Okami was next scheduled to return at UFC 104 against Chael Sonnen. Okami lost to Sonnen via unanimous decision (30–27, 30–27, 30–27). After the fight, Okami trained at Team Quest with Sonnen for one month before returning to Japan. Sonnen stated in an interview “I want to say hello to my brother, Yushin through this interview. I am saddened that he returned to Japan – it feels like I parted with a close friend. Though Yushin lost against me, he came forward and asked to train with me: Is this a Japanese thing? It is admirable that he tried to learn from an opponent who defeated him. While at Team Quest in Portland, he thoroughly handled me during training. I was lucky that I managed to defeat him in our fight. I probably won’t agree to a rematch with him (laughs). The one fighter whom I never want to fight again – that is Yushin Okami.”

2010–2011
Okami defeated Lucio Linhares via TKO doctor stoppage at UFC Fight Night 21. In his fight with Linhares, Okami showcased much improved striking skills which led to the stoppage.

On August 1, 2010, Okami defeated Mark Muñoz via split decision in the co-main event at UFC Live on Versus: 2. Okami was able to stuff most of Muñoz's takedowns and kept the fight standing where he showed superior striking, stunning Muñoz in the third round with a straight right counter.

Okami was expected to face Vitor Belfort on November 13, 2010, at UFC 122, with the winner facing Anderson Silva for the UFC Middleweight Championship. Belfort was then pulled from the fight, and Nate Marquardt was tapped to make a quick return to face Okami. Okami was able to control the center of the octagon and dictate the pace of the fight en route to a unanimous decision victory in what was a closely contested bout.

Okami faced Anderson Silva at UFC 134 on August 27, 2011, for the UFC Middleweight Championship. In this match, Okami was rocked badly by a headkick in the first round. In the second round, Okami was dropped by a straight-right and then dropped again this time by a right hook. He was finished and defeated via TKO in the second round.

2012–2013
Okami next faced Tim Boetsch on February 26, 2012, at UFC 144. While Okami dominated the first two rounds, Boetsch claimed one of the biggest upsets of 2012 in Okami's home country in a brutal flurry of uppercuts from the clinch that left Okami losing in a devastating TKO comeback win for Boetsch in the final frame.

Okami was expected to face Luiz Cane on August 11, 2012, at UFC 150. However, Cane was forced out of the bout with an injury and replaced by Rousimar Palhares. Palhares was also injured and replaced by Buddy Roberts. Okami won the fight via TKO in the second round.

A rematch with Alan Belcher took place on December 29, 2012, at UFC 155. Okami won via unanimous decision for the second time.

Okami next faced former Bellator Middleweight Champion Hector Lombard at UFC on Fuel TV: Silva vs. Stann on March 3, 2013. Okami won the bout via split decision.

Okami faced Ronaldo Souza on September 4, 2013, at UFC Fight Night 28. He lost the fight via KO in the first round. Souza came out and rocked Okami, then shoved him in to the cage while throwing flurries of punches. Okami got back to the center of the cage, but Souza quickly hunted him down and unleashed a devastating overhand right dropping Okami. Then, he proceeded to finish the fight with brutal ground and pound.

Despite being ranked as a top 10 Middleweight by most sources, Okami was released by the UFC on September 27, 2013. When asked via Twitter why he released Okami, UFC President Dana White remarked "Our roster is packed." When asked by Yahoo Sports why he was releasing a highly ranked fighter who had won three of his last four bouts, White responded: "He was always a tough guy and was right up there, but it's almost like he'd become a gatekeeper. I like Okami, and you've heard me say this many times, that a win over Yushin Okami meant something ... But he was never able to get over the hump and win one of those [significant] fights. We have a lot of guys coming in and I've been saying this all year: We have a full roster and there are guys who deserve opportunities. When you bring guys in, someone has to go. That's why these fights are so meaningful."

World Series of Fighting
On October 13, 2013, it was announced that Okami had signed with World Series of Fighting. He made his WSOF debut at WSOF 9, on March 29, 2014, against Svetlozar Savov. He won via arm triangle choke submission in the second round.

In his second fight for the promotion, Okami faced David Branch for the WSOF middleweight championship at WSOF 15 on November 15, 2014. He lost the fight via TKO in the fourth round.

Okami was scheduled to face Ryan Ford in the main event of WSOF 21 on June 5, 2015. However, Ford announced that he had to pull out of the fight with Okami due to an injury. On July 30, 2015, it was announced that Okami would be moving down to the welterweight division and facing Jon Fitch on October 17, 2015, at WSOF 24. Okami lost the fight by unanimous decision.

On September 13, 2016, it was announced that Okami would be facing Paul Bradley on December 31, 2016, at WSOF 34. He won the back-and-forth fight by split decision.

Professional Fighters League
Once the World Series of Fighting was transformed into the Professional Fighters League, Okami was booked for the new promotion's second fight card. For his first fight with the promotion (technically his fifth fight under the promotion's management), he fought Andre Lobato. After three rounds, Okami defeated Lobato by unanimous decision.

Second run in the UFC
Okami replaced Maurício Rua against Ovince Saint Preux in a Light Heavyweight bout on September 23, 2017, at UFC Fight Night: Saint Preux vs. Okami. Despite less than a week notice, Okami had stated he was preparing for a potential fight at Middleweight, but jumped on the opportunity for another shot with the UFC. He lost the fight via submission in round one.

Okami faced Dhiego Lima in a welterweight bout on April 14, 2018, at UFC on Fox 29. He won the fight by unanimous decision.

Okami faced Alexey Kunchenko on December 2, 2018, at UFC Fight Night 142. He lost the fight via unanimous decision.

ONE Championship
On February 20, 2019, it was reported that Okami was signed by ONE Championship. Okami is expected to co-headline ONE Championship: For Honor against Kiamrian Abbasov on May 4, 2019. Okami lost his debut fight via second-round TKO.

He was then set to face James Nakashima at ONE Championship: Dawn Of Heroes on August 2, 2019. Okami lost by unanimous decision. 

Okami won his next fight against Agilan Thani by split decision at ONE Championship: Century on October 13, 2019.

Okami was scheduled to make his return against Leandro Ataides at ONE: Heavy Hitters on January 14, 2022. The bout was scrapped for unknown reasons.

After over three years of inactivity, Okami was scheduled to face former ONE Middleweight and Light Heavyweight World Champion Aung La Nsang at ONE on Prime Video 4 on November 19, 2022. However, the bout was postponed to ONE 163 for undisclosed reasons. He lost the fight via technical knockout in the first round.

Mixed martial arts record

|-
|Loss
|align=center|37–15
|Aung La Nsang
|TKO (punches)
|ONE 163
|
|align=center|1
|align=center|1:42
|Kallang, Singapore
| 
|-
|Win
|align=center|37–14
|Agilan Thani
|Decision (split)
|ONE: Century Part 1
|
|align=center|3
|align=center|5:00
|Tokyo, Japan
|
|-
|Loss
|align=center|36–14
|James Nakashima
|Decision (unanimous)
|ONE: Dawn of Heroes
|
|align=center|3
|align=center|5:00
|Pasay, Philippines
|
|-
|Loss
|align=center|36–13
|Kiamrian Abbasov  
|TKO (punches)
|ONE: For Honor
|
|align=center|2
|align=center|1:10
|Jakarta, Indonesia
| 
|-
|Loss
|align=center|36–12
|Alexey Kunchenko
|Decision (unanimous)
|UFC Fight Night: dos Santos vs. Tuivasa
|
|align=center|3
|align=center|5:00
|Adelaide, Australia
| 
|-
|Win
|align=center|36–11
|Dhiego Lima
|Decision (unanimous)
|UFC on Fox: Poirier vs. Gaethje
|
|align=center|3
|align=center|5:00
|Glendale, Arizona, United States
|
|-
|Loss
|align=center|35–11
|Ovince Saint Preux
|Technical Submission (Von Flue choke)
|UFC Fight Night: Saint Preux vs. Okami
|
|align=center|1
|align=center|1:50
|Saitama, Japan
|
|-
|Win
|align=center|35–10
|Andre Lobato
|Decision (unanimous)
|PFL 2
|
|align=center|3
|align=center|5:00
|Everett, Washington, United States
|
|-
|Win
|align=center|34–10
|Paul Bradley
|Decision (split)
|WSOF 34
|
|align=center|3
|align=center|5:00
|New York City, New York, United States
|
|-
| Win
| align=center|33–10
| Shingo Suzuki
| Submission (rear-naked choke)
| Pancrase 279
| 
| align=center| 1
| align=center| 2:06
| Tokyo, Japan
|
|-
| Win
| align=center|32–10
| Ryuta Sakurai
| TKO (corner stoppage)
| DEEP 75 Impact: 15th Anniversary
| 
| align=center| 2
| align=center| 4:23
| Tokyo, Japan
|
|-
| Loss
| align=center|31–10
| Jon Fitch
| Decision (unanimous)
| WSOF 24
| 
| align=center| 3
| align=center| 5:00
| Mashantucket, Connecticut, United States
|
|-
| Loss
| align=center|31–9
| David Branch
| TKO (punches)
| WSOF 15
| 
| align=center| 4
| align=center| 3:39
| Tampa, Florida, United States
| 
|-
| Win
| align=center| 31–8
| Svetlozar Savov
| Submission (arm-triangle choke)
| WSOF 9
| 
| align=center| 2
| align=center| 4:46
| Las Vegas, Nevada, United States
|
|-
| Loss
| align=center| 30–8
| Ronaldo Souza
| TKO (punches)
| UFC Fight Night: Teixeira vs. Bader
| 
| align=center| 1
| align=center| 2:47
| Rio de Janeiro, Brazil
|
|-
| Win
| align=center| 30–7
| Hector Lombard
| Decision (split)
| UFC on Fuel TV: Silva vs. Stann
| 
| align=center| 3
| align=center| 5:00
| Saitama, Japan
| 
|-
| Win
| align=center| 29–7
| Alan Belcher
| Decision (unanimous)
| UFC 155
| 
| align=center| 3
| align=center| 5:00
| Las Vegas, Nevada, United States
| 
|-
| Win
| align=center| 28–7
| Buddy Roberts
| TKO (punches)
| UFC 150
| 
| align=center| 2
| align=center| 3:05
| Denver, Colorado, United States
| 
|-
| Loss
| align=center| 27–7
| Tim Boetsch
| KO (punches)
| UFC 144
| 
| align=center| 3
| align=center| 0:54
| Saitama, Japan
| 
|-
| Loss
| align=center| 27–6
| Anderson Silva
| TKO (punches)
| UFC 134
| 
| align=center| 2
| align=center| 2:04
| Rio de Janeiro, Brazil
| 
|-
| Win
| align=center| 27–5
| Nate Marquardt
| Decision (unanimous)
| UFC 122
| 
| align=center| 3
| align=center| 5:00
| Oberhausen, Germany
| 
|-
| Win
| align=center| 26–5
| Mark Muñoz
| Decision (split)
| UFC Live: Jones vs. Matyushenko
| 
| align=center| 3
| align=center| 5:00
| San Diego, California, United States
| 
|-
| Win
| align=center| 25–5
| Lucio Linhares
| TKO (doctor stoppage)
| UFC Fight Night: Florian vs. Gomi
| 
| align=center| 2
| align=center| 2:47
| Charlotte, North Carolina, United States
| 
|-
| Loss
| align=center| 24–5
| Chael Sonnen
| Decision (unanimous)
| UFC 104
| 
| align=center| 3
| align=center| 5:00
| Los Angeles, California, United States
| 
|-
| Win
| align=center| 24–4
| Dean Lister
| Decision (unanimous)
| UFC 92
| 
| align=center| 3
| align=center| 5:00
| Las Vegas, Nevada, United States
| 
|-
| Win
| align=center| 23–4
| Evan Tanner
| KO (knee)
| UFC 82
| 
| align=center| 2
| align=center| 3:00
| Columbus, Ohio, United States
| 
|-
| Win
| align=center| 22–4
| Jason MacDonald
| Decision (unanimous)
| UFC 77
| 
| align=center| 3
| align=center| 5:00
| Cincinnati, Ohio, United States
| 
|-
| Loss
| align=center| 21–4
| Rich Franklin
| Decision (unanimous)
| UFC 72
| 
| align=center| 3
| align=center| 5:00
| Belfast, Northern Ireland
| 
|-
| Win
| align=center| 21–3
| Mike Swick
| Decision (unanimous)
| UFC 69
| 
| align=center| 3
| align=center| 5:00
| Houston, Texas, United States
| 
|-
| Win
| align=center| 20–3
| Rory Singer
| TKO (punches)
| UFC 66
| 
| align=center| 3
| align=center| 4:03
| Las Vegas, Nevada, United States
| 
|-
| Win
| align=center| 19–3
| Kalib Starnes
| TKO (punches)
| UFC 64
| 
| align=center| 3
| align=center| 1:40
| Las Vegas, Nevada, United States
| 
|-
| Win
| align=center| 18–3
| Alan Belcher
| Decision (unanimous)
| UFC 62
| 
| align=center| 3
| align=center| 5:00
| Las Vegas, Nevada, United States
| 
|-
| Win
| align=center| 17–3
| Izuru Takeuchi
| TKO (punches)
| GCM: D.O.G. 6
| 
| align=center| 1
| align=center| 3:39
| Tokyo, Japan
| 
|-
| Win
| align=center| 16–3
| Ji Won Bang
| TKO (punches)
| MARS: World Grand Prix
| 
| align=center| 1
| align=center| 4:38
| Chiba, Japan
|
|-
| Loss
| align=center| 15–3
| Jake Shields
| Decision (majority)
| Rumble on the Rock 9
| 
| align=center| 3
| align=center| 5:00
| Honolulu, Hawaii, United States
| 
|-
| Win
| align=center| 15–2
| Anderson Silva
| DQ (illegal upkick)
| Rumble on the Rock 8
| 
| align=center| 1
| align=center| 2:33
| Honolulu, Hawaii, United States
| 
|-
| Win
| align=center| 14–2
| Myun Joo Lee
| TKO (corner stoppage)
| Hero's 2005 in Seoul
| 
| align=center| 1
| align=center| 4:14
| Seoul, South Korea
|
|-
| Win
| align=center| 13–2
| Damien Riccio
| TKO (punches)
| GCM: D.O.G. 3
| 
| align=center| 2
| align=center| 2:44
| Tokyo, Japan
| 
|-
| Win
| align=center| 12–2
| Nick Thompson
| Submission (elbow injury)
| GCM: D.O.G. 2
| 
| align=center| 1
| align=center| 0:29
| Tokyo, Japan
| 
|-
| Win
| align=center| 11–2
| Brian Foster
| Submission (arm-triangle choke)
| GCM: D.O.G. 1
| 
| align=center| 3
| align=center| 2:53
| Tokyo, Japan
| 
|-
| Win
| align=center| 10–2
| Eiji Ishikawa
| Decision (unanimous)
| Pancrase: Brave 9
| 
| align=center| 3
| align=center| 5:00
| Tokyo, Japan
| 
|-
| Loss
| align=center| 9–2
| Falaniko Vitale
| Decision (split)
| SuperBrawl 36
| 
| align=center| 3
| align=center| 5:00
| Honolulu, Hawaii, United States
|
|-
| Win
| align=center| 9–1
| Ryuta Sakurai
| Decision (unanimous)
| PRIDE Bushido 2
| 
| align=center| 2
| align=center| 5:00
| Yokohama, Japan
|
|-
| Win
| align=center| 8–1
| Kousei Kubota
| TKO (punches)
| GCM: Demolition 13
| 
| align=center| 1
| align=center| 1:47
| Japan
| 
|-
| Loss
| align=center| 7–1
| Amar Suloev
| TKO (punches)
| M-1 MFC: Russia vs. the World 6
| 
| align=center| 1
| align=center| 4:44
| Moscow, Russia
|
|-
| Win
| align=center| 7–0
| Kazuhiro Hanada
| TKO (punches)
| GCM: Demolition 9
| 
| align=center| 1
| align=center| 4:47
| Yokohama, Japan
| 
|-
| Win
| align=center| 6–0
| Hidehiko Hasegawa
| Decision (unanimous)
| GCM: Demolition 7
| 
| align=center| 2
| align=center| 5:00
| Tokyo, Japan
| 
|-
| Win
| align=center| 5–0
| Hikaru Sato
| Decision (unanimous)
| Pancrase: Hybrid 1
| 
| align=center| 2
| align=center| 5:00
| Tokyo, Japan
| 
|-
| Win
| align=center| 4–0
| Sen Nakadai
| Decision (unanimous)
| Pancrase: Spirit 8
| 
| align=center| 2
| align=center| 5:00
| Yokohama, Japan
| 
|-
| Win
| align=center| 3–0
| Steve White
| Submission (punches)
| PRIDE FC: The Best, Vol. 3
| 
| align=center| 2
| align=center| 3:25
| Tokyo, Japan
| 
|-
| Win
| align=center| 2–0
| Kyosuke Sasaki
| Decision (unanimous)
| GCM: Demolition 1
| 
| align=center| 2
| align=center| 5:00
| Japan
| 
|-
| Win
| align=center| 1–0
| Hidehisa Matsuda
| TKO (punches)
| Pride The Best Vol.2
| 
| align=center| 1
| align=center| 3:52
| Tokyo, Japan
|

In popular culture
Okami’s likeness was used as an inspiration to design the Titan form of Eren Jaeger from Hajime Isayama's manga/anime series Attack on Titan.

References

External links
 
 
 

1981 births
Living people
Japanese male mixed martial artists
Middleweight mixed martial artists
Welterweight mixed martial artists
Mixed martial artists utilizing judo
Mixed martial artists utilizing Brazilian jiu-jitsu
Japanese practitioners of Brazilian jiu-jitsu
People awarded a black belt in Brazilian jiu-jitsu
Japanese male judoka
People from Kanagawa Prefecture
Wajitsu Keishukai
Ultimate Fighting Championship male fighters